Auerberg is a foothill of the Alps in Allgäu, Bavaria, Germany.
It has a better known sibling, Hoher Peißenberg, 22 km air-line distance to the northeast.
Attached to the little church building (St. George's) on the summit, there is an observation platform, 
reachable via a tight staircase in the tower, which offers great views. 
An impressive experience is also when the church bells ring just next to you.

Hills of Bavaria